Patricio José Patrón Laviada (born December 17, 1957, in Mérida, Yucatán) is a Mexican politician who served as Governor of Yucatán from 2001 to 2007. He is currently serving as Attorney General of Environmental Protection (Procuraduria Federal de Proteccion al Ambiente), a position to which he was appointed by Felipe Calderón, President of Mexico, in January 2008.

Patricio Patrón is the first governor of the state of Yucatán who emanated from the National Action Party (PAN), through a coalition with the Party of the Democratic Revolution (PRD), the Labor Party (PT) and the Ecologist Green Party of Mexico (PVEM), despite the contempt and the campaign organized against him by his predecessor Víctor Cervera, defeated his opponent of the Institutional Revolutionary Party (PRI), Orlando Paredes Lara in the election that took place in 2001 by a wide margin, largely thanks to the program "Adopt a City" that was implemented by pianist Ermilo Castilla Roche.

Patrón took office as governor in 2001; his term of office expired in 2007. Patrón became Municipal president of Mérida for the 1995 – 1998 term beating Ricardo Dájer of the PRI. Patrón then served as a senator representing his state before being elected governor.  He is a member of the National Action Party and currently serves as Attorney General for Environmental Protection.

External links
 Official Website of PROFEPA (Environmental Protection)

1957 births
Living people
Politicians from Yucatán (state)
People from Mérida, Yucatán
Governors of Yucatán (state)
National Action Party (Mexico) politicians
21st-century Mexican politicians
20th-century Mexican politicians
Municipal presidents of Mérida